Jacob D. Lehrer, (born January 3, 1964) is a sprint canoer from Antigua and Barbuda who competed in the mid-1990s. At the 1996 Summer Olympics, he advanced to the semifinals of the C-2 1000 m event, but did not compete.

References
Sports-Reference.com profile

1964 births
Antigua and Barbuda male canoeists
Antigua and Barbuda people of German descent
Canoeists at the 1996 Summer Olympics
Living people
Olympic canoeists of Antigua and Barbuda